Alex P. Garcia (June 22, 1929 – April 10, 1999) was an American politician in the state of California. He served in the California State Assembly from 1969 to 1974 and as a California State Senator from 1974 to 1982. He was a Democrat. He attended Los Angeles Schools, East Los Angeles Junior College, UCLA, and Southern California College of Business. He married Blanche Alvarez in 1948; his children are Alex, Jr., twins Daniel and Thomas, Cecilia and Catherine. He was  a veteran of the U.S. Army.

Background
Garcia, from Los Angeles, was the third Latino Democrat elected in 1968 to the Assembly.  Peter R. Chacon, a Democrat from San Diego was elected in 1970.  Together they formed the Chicano Legislative Caucus in 1973, along with three more Latinos, Joseph Montoya, Ray Gonzales, and Richard Alatorre, who elected to the State Assembly in 1972.

The formation of the Caucus was a significant achievement for the Latino community in California.  The Caucus worked to create, and implement laws that serve to extend, protect, and reserve the rights of Californian Latinos, a first in California legislative history.

References

1929 births
1999 deaths
Politicians from El Paso, Texas
Hispanic and Latino American state legislators in California
Military personnel from Texas
Democratic Party members of the California State Assembly
University of California, Los Angeles alumni
Democratic Party California state senators
20th-century American politicians
Politicians from Los Angeles